The following is a list of cannabis rights organizations:

Cannabis rights organizations

 Alliance for Cannabis Therapeutics
 American Alliance for Medical Cannabis
 American Civil Liberties Union
 American Medical Marijuana Association
 Americans for Safe Access
 Buffalo Cannabis Movement
 California Cannabis Research Medical Group
 Cannabis Law Reform
 Coalition for Rescheduling Cannabis
 Dagga Couple
 Dank of England
 Doctors for Cannabis Regulation
 Drug Policy Alliance
 European Industrial Hemp Association
 FAAAT think & do tank
 Finnish Cannabis Association
 Global Commission on Drug Policy
 Great Legalisation Movement India
 Green Panthers
 Hemp Industries Association
 International Hemp Building Association
 Law Enforcement Action Partnership
 Marijuana Policy Project
 Medical Marijuana Assistance Program of America
 Multidisciplinary Association for Psychedelic Studies
 National Cannabis Industry Association
 National Organization for the Reform of Marijuana Laws (NORML)
 Massachusetts Cannabis Reform Coalition (MassCann/NORML)
 Minnesota NORML
 NORML France
 NORML New Zealand
 NORML UK
 Ohio NORML
 Oregon NORML
 Otago NORML
 Portland NORML
 Texas NORML
 Wisconsin NORML
 November Coalition
 Patients Out of Time
 Rhode Island Patient Advocacy Coalition
 Safer Alternative for Enjoyable Recreation
 Society of Cannabis Clinicians
 Students for Sensible Drug Policy
 Transform Drug Policy Foundation
 Veterans for Medical Cannabis Access
 Women Grow

Political parties

 Ale Yarok
 Aotearoa Legalise Cannabis Party
 Australian Marijuana Party
 Bloc pot
 British Columbia Marijuana Party
 Cannabis Party (Denmark)
 Cannabis Party (Spain)
 CISTA
 Dagga Party
 Freedom Party of Manitoba
 Grassroots-Legalize Cannabis Party
 Grassroots Party
 Holocaust Survivors and Grown-Up Green Leaf Party
 Independent Grassroots Party
 Legalise Cannabis Australia
 Legal Marijuana Now (United States)
 Minnesota Legal Marijuana Now Party
 Nebraska Legal Marijuana NOW Party
 New Jersey Legalize Marijuana Party
 Marijuana Party (Canada)
 Marijuana Reform Party
 Saskatchewan Marijuana Party
 U.S. Marijuana Party
 Youth International Party

Festivals

 Emerald Empire Hempfest
 Freedom Rally
 Global Marijuana March
 Great Midwest Marijuana Harvest Festival
 Hanfparade
 Hash Bash
 John Sinclair Freedom Rally
 MardiGrass
 Missoula Hempfest
 Moscow Hemp Fest
 National Cannabis Festival
 Olympia Hempfest
 Portland Hempstalk Festival
 Salem Hempfest
 Seattle Hempfest
 Spannabis
 Weedstock
 Weed the People

Churches

 Church of Cognizance
 Church of the Universe
 Ethiopian Zion Coptic Church
 First Church of Cannabis
 International Church of Cannabis
 THC Ministry

Museums

 Cannabis Museum (Japan)
 Hash, Marihuana & Hemp Museum
 Hemp Museum (Berlin)
 Hemp Museum Gallery
 Montevideo Cannabis Museum
 Whakamana Cannabis Museum

See also

 List of anti-cannabis organizations
 List of cannabis companies
 List of cannabis rights leaders

Rights Organizations
 Rights
Rights Organizations
Cannabis